Department of Architecture is a government department under the Ministry of Housing and Public Works in Bangladesh. It is responsible for designs for the Ministry. It is located in Dhaka, Bangladesh. A.S.M. Aminur Rahman is the chief architect of the department.

History
Department of Architecture was established in 1952 through the Principal Architect Construction Construction Act of 1952. It is led by a chief architect. In 2013 following the Rana Plaza disaster the department was given the responsibility to improve safety.

References

Government departments of Bangladesh
1952 establishments in East Pakistan
Organisations based in Dhaka